The Prague-Korchak culture was an archaeological culture attributed to the Early Slavs. The other contemporary main Early Slavic culture was the Prague-Penkovka culture situated further south, with which it makes up the "Prague-type pottery" group. The largest part of sites dates to the late 5th and early 6th century AD according to Late Roman iron fibulae. Settlements were as a rule placed at rivers, near water sources, and were typically unfortified, with 8–20 households with courtyards. Burial sites were both flat graves and barrows (kurgans), and cremation was dominant.

Scholar M. Kazanski identified the 6th-century Prague (Prague-Korchak) culture and Sukow-Dziedzice group as Sclaveni archaeological cultures, and the Penkovka culture (Prague-Penkovka) was identified as Antes.

See also
Korchak culture
Penkovka culture
Ipotesti-Candesti culture
Kolochin culture
Sclaveni
Antes people
Early Slavs

References

Sources

 
 
 

Early Slavic archaeology
Slavic archaeological cultures
Early medieval archaeological cultures of Europe
Archaeological cultures in Austria
Archaeological cultures in the Czech Republic
Archaeological cultures in Germany
Archaeological cultures in Hungary
Archaeological cultures in Poland
Archaeological cultures in Slovakia
Archaeological cultures in Ukraine
6th century in Europe